Events from the year 1744 in Great Britain.

Incumbents
 Monarch – George II
 Prime Minister – Henry Pelham (Whig)
 Parliament – 9th

Events
 10–11 February (22–23 February New Style) – War of the Austrian Succession: British fleet defeated by a Franco-Spanish fleet at the Battle of Toulon with loss of the fire ship  and all her crew.
 27 February – a planned French invasion of Britain fails when a violent storm partially wrecks the French invasion force attempting to cross from Dunkirk to Maldon.
 4–15 March – War of the Austrian Succession: France declares war on Britain.
 3 October –  is wrecked on the Casquets in the Channel Islands with the loss of around 900 lives.
 28 December–8 January 1745 – War of the Austrian Succession: The Quadruple Alliance of Britain, Austria, Saxony-Poland and the United Netherlands is formed against Prussia.
 Undated
 Northampton General Hospital established as Northampton Infirmary.
 Mineral springs discovered at Thorp Spa in the West Riding of Yorkshire by John Shires.

Publications
 April – Eliza Haywood's monthly The Female Spectator begins publication, the first periodical written for women by a woman.
 Samuel Johnson's biography of Richard Savage.
 John Newbery's children's book A Little Pretty Pocket-Book.
 Tommy Thumb's Pretty Song Book, containing the earliest known printed versions of many nursery rhymes.
 William Williams Pantycelyn's first collection of Welsh hymns Aleluia (first part).
 The first known Laws of cricket.
 First definitive version of the national anthem God Save the King in Thesaurus Musicus.

Births
 13 February – David Allan, painter (died 1796)
 19 May – Charlotte of Mecklenburg-Strelitz, queen of George III of Great Britain (died 1818)
 21 May – Samuel Ireland, author and engraver (died 1800)
 31 May – Richard Lovell Edgeworth, politician, writer and inventor (died 1817)
29 July  Thomas Glenn Kelly born in this oldest man in lived in uk

Deaths
 14 February – John Hadley, mathematician and inventor (born 1682)
 4 March –  John Anstis, herald (born 1669)
 30 May – Alexander Pope, writer (born 1688)
 29 June – John Eames, dissenting tutor (born 1686)
 9 August – James Brydges, 1st Duke of Chandos, patron of the arts (born 1673)
 18 October – Sarah Churchill, Duchess of Marlborough, friend of Queen Anne (born 1660)

References

 
Years in Great Britain